Viki is a 1935 Hungarian operetta by Pál Ábrahám to a libretto by Imre Harmath and Adorján Bónyi.  It premiered on 26 January 1935 at the National Theatre (Budapest) (or Magyar Színház).

Synopsis 
Viki is a headstrong, boisterous young woman who prefers to dress and act like a man. When she gets into an argument with the equally quarrelsome Feri, he fails to see through her disguise and challenges her to a duel, "man to man." During the duel Feri discovers Viki's true gender and instantly falls in love with her.

Film 
Two years after its premiere in Budapest, the operetta was made into a film in 1937 by the Hungarian director Márton Keleti, with Rosy Barsony as Viki, Paul Javor as Feri, Gyula Csortos as Hadhazy, and Lili Berky as Mme. Hadhazy.

References 

 

Operas by Paul Abraham
1935 operas
Hungarian-language operettas
Operas